Milo May "Max" Marshall (September 18, 1913 – September 16, 1993) was a professional baseball outfielder. He played three seasons in Major League Baseball, primarily as a right fielder, for the Cincinnati Reds from 1942 to 1944. He was a native of Randolph, Iowa.

Marshall is one of many ballplayers who only appeared in the major leagues during World War II. He was a regular for the Reds during most of his 2½ years with the team. In 1942 he finished in the league's top ten for sacrifice hits, and in 1943 did the same for triples and stolen bases.

Career totals include 329 games played, 311 hits, 15 home runs, 105 RBI, 140 runs, a .245 batting average, and a slugging percentage of .339. He was an average defensive outfielder for his era, and in his 317 appearances had a fielding percentage of .975. One defensive highlight was 12 assists in 1943.

Marshall died in Salem, Oregon at the age of 79.

External links

Major League Baseball right fielders
Cincinnati Reds players
Norfolk Elks players
Springfield Cardinals players
Sacramento Solons players
New Orleans Pelicans (baseball) players
Columbus Red Birds players
Oakland Oaks (baseball) players
Tulsa Oilers (baseball) players
Los Angeles Angels (minor league) players
Salem Senators players
Baseball players from Iowa
1913 births
1993 deaths